First Presbyterian Church of Langford was a historic Presbyterian church in Langford, South Dakota. It was built in 1925 and added to the National Register of Historic Places in 1991. A marker at the site suggests the church existed from 1896 to 1997.

References

Presbyterian churches in South Dakota
Churches on the National Register of Historic Places in South Dakota
Churches completed in 1925
Churches in Marshall County, South Dakota
National Register of Historic Places in Marshall County, South Dakota